Nieve de Medina (born 1962) is a Spanish actress and stage director.

Biography 
Nieve de Medina was born in Madrid in 1962. She made her film debut as an actress with a small part in Carlos Saura's ¡Dispara! (1993). Following an appearance in Pellet (2000), her performance in the 2002 drama Mondays in the Sun, where she portrayed Ana (a worker in a production line of a cannery, married to Luis Tosar's José), made her known to the public, earning various accolades. Her television credits include performances in Cuéntame cómo pasó and El ministerio del tiempo. She also works as stage director at the RESAD.

Filmography

Film

Television

Accolades

References 

1962 births
Living people
20th-century Spanish actresses
21st-century Spanish actresses
Spanish film actresses
Spanish television actresses
Spanish theatre directors